Anton Pavlovich Shkarin (born 15 November 1982) is a Russian beach soccer player. He currently plays as defender for Krylya Sovetov Samara.

Career
Shkarin began his professional beach soccer team in the Spartak-Shchyolkovo club. He played for three seasons in the Russian club Strogino, and since 2010 he is playing for Lokomotive Moscow. His first coach was Vladimir Sinitsa. He debuted for the national team at the 2005 Euro Beach Soccer Cup. 

In the 2013 FIFA Beach Soccer World Cup Final, Shkarin scored the first goal against Spain and helped his team win the cup scoring 5-1.

In December 2018, Shkarin switched to Spartak Moscow. For Lokomotive he scored 62 goals in a record 243 appearances.

In 2019, Anton Shkarin, Artur Paporotnyi, Maxim Chuzhkov and Yuri Krashennikov scored a goal each at the 2019 FIFA Beach Soccer World Cup bringing the score 7–1 against Italy.

Personal life
Shkarin enrolled at the MGSU as a structural architect. 

On 8 July 2012, Shkarin made an offer to his girl Marina on the beach field after the match against Spain. They then married and she gave birth to Pavel. Shkarin lives in Fryazino.

Achievements

National team
FIFA Beach Soccer World Cup champion: 2011, 2013, 2021
Beach Soccer Intercontinental Cup champion: 2011, 2012, 2015
Euro Beach Soccer Cup champion: 2010, 2012
Euro Beach Soccer League champion: 2009, 2011, 2013, 2014, 2017

Clubs
Russian National champion: 2005, 2008, 2009, 2010, 2011, 2012, 2017
Russian Cup champion: 2008, 2009, 2011, 2012, 2013, 2016
Russian Super Cup: 2011

Individually
Merited Master of Sports (21 December 2012)

References

External links
Profile on Beach Soccer Russia
Profile on FC Lokomotiv 

1982 births
Living people
Russian beach soccer players
European Games gold medalists for Russia
Beach soccer players at the 2015 European Games
European Games medalists in beach soccer
Beach soccer players at the 2019 European Games
Sportspeople from Magadan Oblast